Tightrope Walker (sometimes Tight Rope Walker) is an outdoor bronze sculpture by Dutch artist Kees Verkade, installed on Columbia University's Revson Plaza in Upper Manhattan, New York City, in 1979. The work commemorates General William J. Donovan and depicts one figure standing atop another as he tightrope walks.

See also
 1979 in art

References

External links
 

1979 establishments in New York City
1979 sculptures
Bronze sculptures in Manhattan
Columbia University campus
Monuments and memorials in Manhattan
Outdoor sculptures in Manhattan
Sculptures of men in New York City
Statues in New York City
Tightrope walking